Bandung Independent School is an IB (International Baccalaureate) school in Bandung, Indonesia.

It educates roughly 200 students on a  campus just north of the city center. The school offers classes from pre-school to Grade 12. The language of instruction is English. BIS, a non-profit school, opened its doors in 1972 in a converted house in Ciumbuleuit. It was founded in 1993. BIS is governed by its School Board composed of parent volunteers (maximum of two representatives from any single country) whose remit is to develop and oversee the strategic direction of the school.

BIS is recognized as the most diverse international school in Bandung; the teachers and students represent approximately 25 different nationalities. BIS is the only school in Bandung to offer all three of the international Baccalaureate programmes, the PYP in the Primary, the MYP in the Middle School, and the Diploma programme in grades 11 and 12. This makes BIS the only IB Continuum Programme in Bandung.

BIS is accredited by the Council of International Schools (CIS) based in the Netherlands; the New England Association of Schools and Colleges (NEASC), based in United States, and authorized by the International Baccalaureate Organization in Geneva, Switzerland to offer the IB continues program.

Programmes
The programmes in Bandung Independent School are:

 The Early Childhood programme lays a foundation for future learning and success. BIS offers the IB Primary Years Programme (IB PYP) in Early Childhood for our 3 – 6 year olds.

 Elementary: Each student in the Elementary years (Grades 1 – 5)  is supported holistically through academic, social, and personal skill development. BIS offers the IB Primary Years Programme (IB PYP) in Elementary. Students explore different subject areas and learn to communicate effectively, appreciate multiple perspectives, and activate critical and creative thinking skills

 Middle School: In April 2022, BIS was authorized by the IB and now offers the IB Middle Years Programme (MYP). Students in the Middle Years at BIS are supported in an environment where students develop academically as well are offered a wide range of extracurricular and service activities.

 High School: Bandung Independent School provides a full High School programme leading to graduation and preparation for university entrance. The Bandung Independent School High School Diploma is based on accumulation of credits earned in Grades 9 – 12.  In Grades 11 and 12, students may also choose to enroll in the IB Diploma Programme.

 BIS offers approximately 50 extra-curricular activities. They include sports, service clubs, leadership opportunities, the arts, and technology among others.

Infrastructure
The school opened its current campus in 1993, located on Jalan Surya Sumantri, about 2 kilometers from the city centre. 

The facilities of BIS include: a Performing Arts Center with theater and practice rooms, two covered courts and a full-size soccer field, two science labs, a swimming pool, a playground for the Elementary students, a library, a canteen and coffee shop/cafe, collaborative workspaces, a computer lab, innovator’s maker space / design lab, and a culinary learning center.

References

External links

www.bisedu.or.id

International schools in Indonesia
International Baccalaureate schools in Indonesia
Schools in Bandung
Educational institutions established in 1972
1972 establishments in Indonesia